General Costică Silion (born 29 September 1955 in Pechea, Galați County) is a Romanian general. Between March 2005 and December 2009 he was the chief (General Inspector) of the Romanian Gendarmerie.

References

Romanian Gendarmerie generals
1955 births
Living people
People from Galați County
University of Bucharest alumni
Carol I National Defence University alumni